Imagen Latina is an album by Venezuelan musician Alberto Naranjo, originally released in 1992 and reedited thrice in 2002, 2008 and 2012. It is the seventh album (fifth studio album) of El Trabuco Venezolano musical project arranged and directed by Naranjo.

Trabuco is a Spanish term used in Venezuelan baseball slang to describe an All-Star selection of players. So,  El Trabuco Venezolano means "The Venezuelan All-Star Band", in the best sense of the phrase. Naranjo (Caracas, 1941) is one of Venezuela's icons of contemporary music, establishing his prestige as an arranger, conductor, composer and drummer. In 1992 Naranjo produced Imagen Latina. Soloists with an already established career in Venezuela participated in this project; renowned salseros as Canelita Medina, Carlos Espósito, Vladimir Lozano, Trina Medina, Carlos Daniel Palacios and Mauricio Silva; noted folklorists as Simón Díaz, Cecilia Todd and the group Serenata Guayanesa, and also counted with the collaboration of poet Jesús Rosas Marcano, musician Benjamín Brea, pop singer María Rivas, jazz pianist Otmaro Ruiz, and the polifacetic Aldemaro Romero. Most salsa bands are a tightly wound unit that developed their music through years of playing in clubs around their hometown. El Trabuco Venezolano never subscribed to that aesthetic. As the vehicle for the arrangements of Naranjo, his Trabuco defied all salsa conventions in the 1970s. The eclectic body of Naranjo's work shows some debt to Billo Frómeta, Tito Puente and the Thad Jones/Mel Lewis Big Band, preferring traditional guaracha, jazz, bolero, mambo and Venezuelan genres, creating a sophisticated and distinctive sound with accessible melodic hooks, complex harmonies and time signatures, as well as a special devotion to the recording studio. This record was never released outside of Venezuela, and after ten years of relative obscurity, the company Merusa Records of Netherlands introduced it at the international level. One of the songs included in the album, Calipso de El Callao, is listed in the book 1001 Songs: You Must Hear Before You Die.

Track listing

Personnel
Alberto Naranjo – leader, arranger, drums on all tracks; timbales (dubbed) on 11, 14
Alberto Lazo – acoustic piano on all tracks, except on 12
Lucio Caminiti – acoustic piano on track 12
Yrvis Méndez – bass guitar on all tracks, except on 12
José Velázquez – bass guitar on track 12
Benjamín Brea – saxophone or woodwinds on all tracks, except on 12(soprano, alto, tenor and baritone saxes; flute, piccolo)
Gustavo Aranguren and Rafael Rey – trumpet and/or flugelhorn on all tracks, except on 12
César Pérez – trombone on all tracks, except on 12 
Gerardo Rosales – congas or additional percussion on all tracks, except on 12 
Franklin Rojas – bongos or additional percussion on all tracks, except on 12
Francisco Rojas – timbales or additional percussion on all tracks, except on 12
Felipe Rengifo – congas on track 12
Jesús Quintero – bongos on track 12
Carlos Daniel Palacios – lead vocal on tracks 3, 6 and chorus
Carlos Espósito – lead vocal on tracks 3, 8, 10 and chorus

Guests
Lead vocals
Canelita Medina – track 1
Trina Medina – tracks 1, 5
Mauricio Silva –  track 2 (trombone solo add)
Serenata Guayanesa – track 4
Cecilia Todd – track 7
Simón Díaz – track 9
María Rivas – track 11
Vladimir Lozano – track 12
Hughette Contramaestre – track 13
Musicians
Pedro Vilela – Cuban tres and electric guitar on track 1
Federico Britos – violin solo on tracks 3, 7
Saúl Vera – mandolin solo on track 4
Alberto Vergara – vibraphone solo on track 10
Aldemaro Romero – acoustic piano cadenza and solo on track 11
Manuel Freire – saxes and woodwinds on track 12(soprano, alto, tenor and baritone saxes; C flute, G flute, clarinet and bass clarinet – all dubbed)
Otmaro Ruíz – acoustic piano solo on 14
Strings section on track 12
Violins: Alberto Flamini (concertmaster), Carmelo Russo, Sigfrido Chiva, Grigorije Girovski,Bogdan Biegniewski, Inocente Carreño, Sigfrido Chiva, Boris Jivkov, Alejandro Ramírez
Violas: Francisco Molo, José Olmedo
Cellos: Lauren Levenson, Bodgan Trochanowski
Harp: Alba Quintanilla

Other credits
Producers: Alberto Naranjo and Orlando Montiel
Executive producers: Mariela León and Freddy León
Staff coordinator: Freddy Sanz
All tracks were recorded and mixed at Estudios Intersonido by Augie Verde (1992),except track 12, recorded and mixed at Estudios Sono Dos Mil by Ricardo Landaeta (1980)
Mastered at Formacol, Venezuela
ID: LEON CD 1140
PD: 21592613 
Releases
Leon CD-1140 (1992)
Merusa CD-9253 (2002)
Leon CD-1140-B (2008) 
Leon CD-1140-C (2012) 
Recorded and produced in Caracas, Venezuela, 1992

Sources and reviews

Chumancera Latin Jazz (Spanish)
Deezer
Descarga
El Trabuco, a music All Stars (English / Spanish / Deutsch)
Fundacion Interchange Netherlands
Salsa 2U (Spanish)
Sincopa
Venciclopedia (Spanish)
Technobeat

1992 albums
Alberto Naranjo albums